Joshua Siegel (born November 15, 1993) is an American politician who is a member of the Pennsylvania House of Representatives. A member of the Democratic Party, he will represent the 22nd district, which contains parts of Allentown and Salisbury Township.

Early life, education, and early career 
Siegel was born in Bethlehem, Pennsylvania in 1993. He graduated from Seton Hall University in 2016 with a Bachelor of Science degree in international relations and diplomacy. Siegel moved to Allentown in 2016. He worked as a field organizer on a Pennsylvania House of Representatives election in the 183rd district. He was a candidate for mayor of Allentown in 2017.

From 2017 to 2020, Siegel worked as the public information officer for Lehigh County, and since 2020 he has worked as the assistant operations manager for the county controller's Office.

Allentown City Council (2020–2022) 
Siegel was elected to the Allentown city council on November 5, 2019, at age 25, making him at the time the youngest member ever elected to the body. Siegel was sworn in on January 6, 2020. He served as chair of the Budget and Finance Committee for three years.

During Siegel's tenure on the city council, he successfully passed paid family leave for city workers, making Allentown the fifth municipality or political subdivision in Pennsylvania to offer this benefit to their city employees. Siegel also successfully led the drive to bring the city's vehicle fleet maintenance back in house after over twenty years of privatization, citing concerns over public safety, treatment of union employees, substandard wages and lengthy times required to service critical city vehicles such as fire trucks and snowplows. Siegel also championed campaign finance reform legislation that would have capped the total size of contributions made by each donor; his bill, the provisions of which he argued would have prevented the corruption scheme that resulted in the resignation and federal conviction of Allentown mayor Ed Pawlowski in 2018, was defeated by a margin of 4–3. Siegel successfully co-sponsored a responsible contractor ordinance that would have required city public works projects to go firms with Class-A apprenticeships, asserting that it would promote workforce development and protect the use of taxpayer dollars by ensuring the use of high-quality labor and contractors.

Following the U.S. Supreme Court decision Dobbs v. Jackson Women's Health Organization which overturned Roe v. Wade, Siegel fought to pass local legislation that would have protected reproductive access in Allentown, including a buffer zone around the local Planned Parenthood clinic to protect those entering from harassment or intimidation, as well as legislation aimed at crisis pregnancy centers for disseminating false or misleading information and prohibiting city resources from being used to aide out of state prosecutors pursuing those coming to Pennsylvania for reproductive care.

Pennsylvania House of Representatives

Elections

2022 
During the 2022 Pennsylvania redistricting process, the city of Allentown gained a third seat in the Pennsylvania House of Representatives. On February 8, 2022, Joshua Siegel declared his candidacy for the newly created seat, numbered as the 22nd district, covering most of the city of Allentown as well as some suburbs to the east and southeast. Siegel's candidacy focused on addressing the crisis of affordability and rising inflation such as the rising cost of housing, education and childcare; as well as economic development and regionalism, education funding, reducing gun violence, comprehensive public safety, affordable housing, responsible development, protecting the right to organize, strengthening unions, protecting democracy, reproductive healthcare and LGBTQ rights.

On May 17, Siegel defeated Saeed Georges by a margin of 64%–36% to win the Democratic nomination for the seat. In the November 8 general election Siegel defeated Robert E. Smith, a former Allentown school board member, by a margin of 64%–36% to become the state representative-elect for the 22nd district.

Committee assignments 
Siegel has been appointed to service on the House Appropriations, Transportation, State Government and Housing and Community Development committees.

Electoral history 

| colspan="6" style="text-align:center;background-color: #e9e9e9;"| Democratic primary election

| colspan="6" style="text-align:center;background-color: #e9e9e9;"| General election

| colspan="6" style="text-align:center;background-color: #e9e9e9;"| Democratic primary election

| colspan="6" style="text-align:center;background-color: #e9e9e9;"| General election

| colspan="6" style="text-align:center;background-color: #e9e9e9;"| Democratic primary election

| colspan="6" style="text-align:center;background-color: #e9e9e9;"| General election

References

External links 

Campaign website

Living people
21st-century American politicians
Democratic Party members of the Pennsylvania House of Representatives
Pennsylvania Democrats
1993 births